Broad Green Pictures was a production and financing company. It was founded in 2014 by CEO Gabriel Hammond and Chief Creative Officer, Daniel Hammond.

Management 
On February 25, 2015, Broad Green Pictures acquired a 45% stake in David Garrett’s London-based sales and distribution outfit, Mister Smith Entertainment. Adam Keen, former VP of Warner Bros. was hired on March 25, 2015 as head of publicity. In April 2015, Christopher Tricario was hired as EVP of business affairs and general counsel. That same month Jeremy Fuchs as the technology officer. In May 2015, Travis Reid was named the president of theatrical distribution. That same month, Dylan Wiley was hired as the president of specialty releasing. In July 2015, Marc Danon joined the company as the president of acquisitions and co-productions, leaving his job as acquisitions and business development senior VP for Lionsgate. On September 3, 2015, Alix Madigan was hired as head of creative affairs, she left Anonymous Content's executive and a staff producer job. She has since left the company, and Broad Green Pictures hired Matt Alvarez as President of Production. Matt Alvarez is a producer of Straight Outta Compton, Ride Along, and Ride Along 2.

In September 2016, Richard Fay was announced to be the head of distribution, replacing Travis Reid who previously resigned.

In 2018, the company was reported to be defunct.

Films

References

External links
 

Film distributors of the United States
American film studios
Mass media companies established in 2014
Companies based in Los Angeles
Film production companies of the United States
2014 establishments in the United States
Home video companies of the United States
Defunct film and television production companies of the United States
Mass media companies disestablished in 2018
2018 disestablishments in California